Benjamin Culmer Hurst is a former New Zealand rugby union player who played as a half-back. Hurst played for the Crusaders and the Highlanders winning two Super Rugby titles.

Hurst is the son of former All Black Ian Hurst. He has a Bachelor of Science from Lincoln University.

Senior career 
Hurst debuted for Canterbury in 1999 and was selected for the New Zealand Colts playing four games, scoring 1 try.

He would go on to debut for the Crusaders on 20 May 2000 against southern rivals the Highlanders.

Hurst was the starting halfback for the Crusaders in the tightly contested 2000 Super 12 Final with the Crusaders prevailing 20–19 against the Brumbies. Playing for the Crusaders Hurst was part of the legendary 2002 Crusaders team which played the entire season undefeated. This culminated in a second Finals appearance against the Brumbies with the Crusaders running out 31-13 victors. In his third Finals appearance he was the replacement halfback for the Crusaders in the 2003 final loss to the Blues.

Hurst was selected as Canterbury captain for the 2003 NPC.

He was not selected for the Crusaders in 2003 signaling the end of his Crusaders Super rugby career. He would go on to play the following season with the Highlanders in Super Rugby and Canterbury in the NPC.

Post career 
Following his rugby career Hurst has been well known for his business activities including early childhood education centres  and investment business with former teammate Daniel Carter.

References 

Living people
Crusaders (rugby union) players
Highlanders (rugby union) players
Canterbury rugby union players
New Zealand rugby union players
Rugby union scrum-halves
Rugby union players from Oamaru
Lincoln University (New Zealand) alumni
Year of birth missing (living people)